Eucalyptus arborella, commonly known as Twertup mallet, is a mallet or small tree that is endemic to a small area in the south-west of Western Australia. It has smooth greyish bark, narrow lance-shaped adult leaves, flower buds in groups of thirteen to twenty fused together, yellowish green flowers, and fruits fused together in a woody mass.

Description
The bark is a whitish-grey colour, sometimes becoming a coppery-pink and smooth over the length of the tree. Flowering occurs from March to May and the flowers are greenish. Cornutae subser. Conjunctae (Myrtaceae) from the south coast of Western Australia, including the description of four new taxa and comments on the hybrid origin of E. benettiae |journal=Nuytsia |date=2008 |volume=18 |pages=206–207 |url=https://florabase.dpaw.wa.gov.au/science/nuytsia/531.pdf |access-date=2 March 2019}}</ref>

Taxonomy and namingEucalyptus arborella was first formally described in 2002 by Ian Brooker and Stephen Hopper from a specimen collected near the Twertup field studies centre in the Fitzgerald River National Park. The description was published in the journal Nuytsia. The specific epithet (arborella) is derived from the Latin word arbor meaning "tree", with the diminutive suffix -ellus, hence "little tree".Eucalyptus arborella belongs in Eucalyptus subgenus Symphyomyrtus section Bisectae subsection Hadrotes because of its coarsely bisected cotyledons, erect stamens and larger, thick rimmed fruits. The subsection Hadrotes contains ten species of which eight do not have oil glands in the branchlet pith. Together these eight species form series Lehmannianae, a group that have fruit with exserted valves that have fused tips even after the seeds are lost, a feature also shared with the distantly related Eucalyptus cornuta.

Of the eight species in series Lehmannianae four species; E. conferruminata, E. lehmannii, E. mcquoidii and E. arborella'' all have the buds in each an axillary cluster that is fused basally.

Distribution and habitat
The Twertup mallet grows in rocky places in the Fitzgerald River National Park and near Corackerup in the Esperance Plains biogeographic region.

Conservation
This eucalypt is classified as "Priority Three" by the Western Australian Government Department of Parks and Wildlife meaning that it is poorly known and known from only a few locations but is not under imminent threat.

See also
List of Eucalyptus species

References

arborella
Endemic flora of Western Australia
Myrtales of Australia
Eucalypts of Western Australia
Plants described in 2002
Taxa named by Ian Brooker
Taxa named by Stephen Hopper